Allen Bartunek (June 12, 1928 – February 1, 1997) was a member of the Ohio House of Representatives.

References

Republican Party members of the Ohio House of Representatives
1928 births
1997 deaths
20th-century American politicians